Viralheat was a subscription-based software service for social media management that helps clients monitor and analyze consumer-created content. It was first released in beta in May 2009. Viralheat raised $75,000 in seed capital in December 2009 and $4.25 million of venture capital from the Mayfield Fund in 2011.

Features
Viralheat was a social media management tool with features for account management, monitoring, analytics and publishing. It tracks the number of mentions an individual or company receives on digital properties and analyzes factors such as influence, sentiment and language. The influence of a Twitter handle is measured based on followers, mentions, and retweets Sentiment is assessed as positive, negative or neutral. Viralheat's Human Intent tool labels social media participants as leads if it assesses that they are likely to consider purchasing a corresponding product. The software's analytics and monitoring can be filtered by location. Data from Viralheat can be exported into PDF files, Excel spreadsheets or onto a publicly available dashboard.

The service charged users based on how many accounts, mentions and profiles they use. A free version could manage up to seven social media accounts. and developer accounts were free. In August 2012, the company claimed to have 6,500 users, one-third of which were using a paid version of the service.

Viralheat also published free application programming interfaces (APIs) and two extensions for the Chrome browser. One extension added a bar to the top of Twitter.com that displayed a sentiment analysis of the mentions displayed on the page. A box was added to each tweet showing its assessed sentiment, which could be changed manually. Another extension called "Flint" added a share button on the browser that could share content being viewed on the browser from sites like Twitter, Facebook or LinkedIn.

History
Viralheat was co-founded by Raj Kadam and Vishal Sankhla. The software was released in beta in May 2009. That October location-based filters were added. Additional updates were made to Viralheat's user interface for reporting, alerts and importing. In December, the developer raised $75,000 in seed capital. In March 2010, Viralheat added features to track Facebook shares, likes and comments. The company raised $4.25 million in series A funding from the Mayfield Fund in June 2011.

The Human Intent application was released in beta in July 2011. Viralheat's Chrome extension for sentiment on Twitter.com was released that September. On March 27, 2012, version 2.0 was introduced. Version 2.0 added the ability to publish content to social media websites through the Viralheat interface. In August of that year, Pinterest monitoring was added, which was followed by the "Flint" extension in November. In February 2013, Viralheat released a redesigned analytics dashboard called Smart Steam as well as other user interface improvements and multiple account features. Flint 2.0 was released that March with support for Safari and Firefox.

In December 2013, Viralheat released enterprise pricing and multi-user features. That same month, it appointed a new CEO, Jeff Revoy, as a result of its new focus on the enterprise market.

Viralheat was acquired by Cision in March 2015, a Chicago-based PR communications company, to augment gaps in their social media offering. As part of the deal, Jeff Revoy would exit the management team and Vishal Sankhla and Raj Kadam would be responsible for integrating the team and technology into Cision's product offering. In May 2015, Cision rebranded Viralheat's product offering and introduced Cision Social Edition (CSE).

As part of Cision's rebranding and integration efforts of Viralheat, the Viralheat website and Viralheat stand-alone product offerings were retired in January 2017 and are no longer accessible or available for sale.

Evaluations
In 2009, Mashable reported that Viralheat has more features than free services, with a lower price than most paid options. A contributor review in PRWeek in 2012 said Viralheat's strengths were its sentiment analysis, simplicity, price and customer service, but that its filtering tools were "a little rough around the edges."

In March 2013, Network World tested eight social media management tools. The reviewer found that Viralheat was the lowest cost, and supported more social media sites than competitors, but lacked the features to support multi-user accounts needed for large (enterprise) customers. The reviewer also praised Viralheat for its user interface and easy cross-posting across different social networks, but said its reporting and analytics were limited. For example, only three date-ranges could be selected when generating a report.

Reported uses
The Viralheat software found there were 7,000 tweets mentioning "Obama" on May 25, 2009 and 32,000 tweets for that week. On April 9, 2010, it assessed that 70 percent of comments about Tiger Woods were positive following his return to professional golf after a sex scandal in late 2009. A sampling collected by the Viralheat software in July 2011 found that 79 percent of tweets about President Barack Obama were positive, while 54 percent of those on Speaker John Boehner were.

Near Thanksgiving 2012, 150,000 tweets were analyzed. Viralheat found that turkey stuffing was mentioned 38,000 times. During the debut of Bravo's TV show "Start-ups: Silicon Valley," the software determined that the character Hermione was mentioned on Twitter 350 times, while Sarah received 264 mentions. A March 2013 report published by Viralheat found that among major airlines American Airlines had the most positive sentiment on social media. It also found that the San Francisco Airport was the most frequently mentioned airport. During March Madness the same year, Viralheat Inc. ran an analysis with the software that found the most talked about team was the one from the University of Miami.

References

External links

 Official website

Social media management platforms
Defunct software companies of the United States
2009 establishments in the United States
Software companies established in 2009
2015 mergers and acquisitions
Software companies disestablished in 2015